The 1903 Delaware football team represented Delaware College—now known as the University of Delaware–as an independent during the 1903 college football season. Led by first-year head coach Nathan Mannakee, Delaware compiled a record of 4–4.

Schedule

References

Delaware
Delaware Fightin' Blue Hens football seasons
Delaware football